Atotoztli may refer to:
Atotoztli I, Princess of Culhuacan
Atotoztli II, daughter of the Aztec emperor Moctezuma I and Chichimecacihuatzin I